Marala Headworks is a headworks situated on the Chenab River near the city of Sialkot in Punjab, Pakistan. A weir was first built during 1906–1912 in British India to feed the Upper Chenab Canal, as part of the 'Triple Canals Project'. A new Marala Barrage  was constructed in 1968 to feed the Marala–Ravi Link Canal in addition to the original Upper Chenab Canal.

History 

The original headworks near Marala along with the Upper Chenab Canal were built as part of the Triple Canals Project of British India during 1906–1912. The canal was meant to irrigate an area of 648,000 acres in the Gujranwala District as well as to transfer waters to the Ravi River near Balloki. It was opened in 1912 and fully completed by 1917 at a cost Rs. 37 million. It became profitable in 1938–39.

The waters transferred to the Ravi River were further fed to the Lower Bari Doab Canal via the Balloki Headworks, irrigating the Montgomery and Multan districts. This canal became profitable at least a decade earlier than the Upper Chenab Canal. The waters of the Ravi River itself were left to irrigate the semi-arid states of Bikaner and Bahawalpur. The link canal concept initiated in the Triple Canals Project eventually became the basis for the Indus Waters Treaty after the independence of India and Pakistan.

The Marala–Ravi Link Canal was constructed between 1952–1956 in the wake of the Indo-Pakistani water dispute of 1948, when Pakistan became apprehensive of water security on the Ravi and Sutlej rivers. This canal transfers 623 cumecs of water to Ravi in order to satisfy the requirements of Balloki and Sulemanki headworks.

Characteristics
Marala Headworks is a large hydro engineering project and is used to control water flow and flood control in the River Chenab.

Geography
After cutting across the Pir Panjal Range, India it enters the Sialkot District in the Pakistan. Here the Marala Barrage was built across the river in 1968 with a maximum discharge of 1.1 million ft³/s (31,000 m³/s). Two major water channels originate at the Marala headworks—the Marala ravi link canal and the Upper Chenab Canal. Proposals are under consideration to build Mangla Marala Link Canal to overcome any shortage of water in future.

Marala Headworks is also a picnic spot, a wildlife sanctuary and an unprotected wetland.

See also
 List of barrages and headworks in Pakistan
 List of dams and reservoirs in Pakistan
Punjab Irrigation Department

References

Bibliography
 
 
 
 
 

Locks (water navigation)
Tourist attractions in Sialkot
Irrigation in Pakistan
Dams on the Chenab River
Dams in Punjab, Pakistan
Dams completed in 1968